The 1983 European Karate Championships, the 18th edition, was held in Madrid, Spain from May 13 to 15, 1983. The women's competition in kumite was held in Brussels, Belgium on February 26 and 27, 1983 (with juniors).

Medallists

Men's Competition

Individual

Team

Women's competition

Individual

Team

References

1983
International karate competitions hosted by Spain
European Karate Championships
European championships in 1983
Sports competitions in Madrid
1980s in Madrid
Karate competitions in Spain
February 1983 sports events in Europe
May 1983 sports events in Europe
Sports competitions in Brussels
Karate competitions in Belgium
1980s in Brussels